Tenebrism, from Italian  ("dark, gloomy, mysterious"), also occasionally called dramatic illumination, is a style of painting using especially pronounced chiaroscuro, where there are violent contrasts of light and dark, and where darkness becomes a dominating feature of the image. The technique was developed to add drama to an image through a spotlight effect, and is common in Baroque paintings. Tenebrism is used only to obtain a dramatic impact while chiaroscuro is a broader term, also covering the use of less extreme contrasts of light to enhance the illusion of three-dimensionality.

Baroque

The artist Caravaggio is generally credited with the invention of the style, although this technique was used  by earlier artists such as Albrecht Dürer, Tintoretto and El Greco. The term is usually applied to artists from the seventeenth century onward. Artemisia Gentileschi, a rare female artist of the Baroque and a follower of Caravaggio, was an outstanding exponent of tenebrism.

El Greco painted three versions of a composition with a boy, a man, and a monkey grouped in darkness around a single flame. Among the best known tenebrist artists are: Italian and Dutch followers (the Utrecht School) of Caravaggio, Francisco Ribalta, Jusepe de Ribera, and their Spanish followers.

Tenebrism is most often applied to seventeenth-century Spanish painters. It is sometimes applied to other seventeenth-century painters in what has been called the "candlelight tradition". These include Georges de La Tour, who painted many works illuminated with a single candle, Trophime Bigot, Gerrit van Honthorst, and Rembrandt. In Flanders Adam de Coster was recognized as a leading tenebrist who excelled in scenes in which a single candle has its light blocked by an object. The Dutch artist Godfried Schalcken painted many candle-lit scenes. The northern painters (but not always Rembrandt) often achieved a mood of stillness and tranquility through their extreme lighting, rather the reverse of the impression that Spanish painters intended. They are typically as interested in the very dimly-lit areas of the painting as the spot-lit ones, and their light diffuses gently across much of the picture area.

The term is not often used of Adam Elsheimer, although he was an important innovator in painting night-scenes with a restricted lighted areas.

Later development
Later, similar compositions were painted by Joseph Wright of Derby and other artists of the Romantic Movement, but the term is rarely used to characterize their work in general.

See also
 Effets de soir

References

External links

Baroque (Cartage.org)
Art Lexicon
Jusepe de Ribera, 1591-1652, a full text exhibition catalog from The Metropolitan Museum of Art, which includes material on Ribera and Tenebrism

Artistic techniques
Baroque painting
Painting
Spanish Baroque